Gaelic folklore may refer to:

Irish folklore
Scottish folklore
Irish mythology
Celtic mythology
Hebridean mythology and folklore